The 2013–14 Southern Utah Thunderbirds women's basketball team represents Southern Utah University during the 2013–14 NCAA Division I women's basketball season. The T–Birds are led by fifth year head coach JR Payne and play their home games at the Centrum Arena. They are members of the Big Sky Conference.

Roster

Schedule

|-
!colspan=10 style="background:#FFFFFF; color:#FF0000;"| Exhibition

|-
!colspan=10 style="background:#FF0000; color:#FFFFFF;"| Regular Season

|-
!colspan=10 style="background:#FFFFFF; color:#FF0000;"| Big Sky tournament

|-
!colspan=10 style="background:#FF0000; color:#FFFFFF;"| 2014 WNIT

See also
 2013–14 Southern Utah Thunderbirds basketball team

References

Southern Utah Thunderbirds women's basketball seasons
Southern Utah
2014 Women's National Invitation Tournament participants
Thunderbirds
Thunderbirds